The Bobritzsch is a river of Saxony, Germany. Its Gewässerkennzahl is 5422.

Course 

The river passes through Reichenau, Kleinbobritzsch, Hartmannsdorf, Friedersdorf, Oberbobritzsch and Niederbobritzsch, Naundorf, Falkenberg, Krummenhennersdorf, Reinsberg and Bieberstein.

A well-known hiking path along Bobritzsch river between Krummenhennersdorf and Reinsberg is called Grabentour. Reinsberg Castle is located on a rock above the right bank of the river, Bieberstein Castle above its left bank.

Origin of the name 

The name of the river originates from Old Sorbian Bobrica, derived from bobr (beaver), and signifies a water course where beavers lived.

Gallery

See also
List of rivers of Saxony

References 

Rivers of Saxony
Rivers of the Ore Mountains
Rivers of Germany